David Sherwin-White (24 February 1942 – 8 January 2018) was a British screenwriter best known for his collaborations with director Lindsay Anderson and actor Malcolm McDowell on the films if.... (1968) (for which Sherwin was nominated for a BAFTA Award for Best Screenplay), O Lucky Man! (1973) and Britannia Hospital (1982).

Sherwin attended Tonbridge School, which provided much of the inspiration for the content of if.....

In 1996, Sherwin published a memoir, Going Mad in Hollywood: And Life with Lindsay Anderson, (Andre Deutsch) . A film of the memoir was planned by the director Michael Winterbottom, with Malcolm McDowell cast as Anderson, but never materialised.

References

External links

1942 births
2018 deaths
British male screenwriters
People educated at Tonbridge School